Santo Cristo (PSGC:) is a Quezon City barangay located in North EDSA, a busy commercial area of shopping malls, transport hubs and office buildings.

Neighboring barangays include Bahay Toro in the north; Veterans Village in the South, Bungad in the southeast; Bagong Pag-asa in the east; Ramon Magsaysay in the west, and Alicia in the northwest under the first Legislative district of Quezon City, Metro Manila, Philippines.

Demography 
As of 2020 census published by the Philippine Statistics Authority, the population of Barangay Santo Cristo is 25,783, a two-fold increase from 2015 due to the inclusion of residents of SMDC's high-rise condominium projects Grass Residences and Fern at the Grass Residences.

Notable Landmarks and Future Development
Only The Annex building of SM City North EDSA complex is located within the southern portion of the barangay, as well as SMDC's Grass Residences. Fern Residences, unofficially known as Towers 4 & 5 of the original Grass Residences project, is almost complete.

Government Schools and Offices 
Sto. Cristo Elementary School
San Francisco High School
San Francisco satellite campus of Quezon City University, formerly known as Quezon City Polytechnic University
Quezon City Science High School
DepEd offices for the National Capital Region and Quezon City Division
DSWD Study and Reception Center for Children

Barangay and Sangguniang Kabataan officials

List of Punong Barangay

Members of Sangguniang Barangay 

The new Barangay and SK Councils were elected on May 14, 2018.

See also 
 Barangays of Quezon City
 Legislative districts of Quezon City
 Quezon City
 Quezon City University
 Vincent Crisologo
 Manila Light Rail Transit System Line 1
 SM City North EDSA
 Barangay elections

References 

Quezon City
Barangays of Quezon City
Barangays of Metro Manila